Szymon Majewski (born 1 June 1967 in Warsaw) is a Polish journalist, showman, radio and television presenter and professional television and film actor.

Majewski is a graduate of Edward Dembowski High School in Warsaw. He has a wife, Magdalena, and two children.

Ędward Ącki
Ędward Ącki is a fictional character created by Majewski. Ędward Ącki has created a fictional political party  (ĘĄ - Painfully Honest), which he provides with Ądrzej Chłodek (Michał Zieliński) and Ągelika Radziwił (Aldona Jankowska).

Filmography 
  (Eng. "Killer") (1997) as Mioduch
  (Eng. "Mothers, wives and lovers II") (1998) as Szymon Majewski
  (Eng. "2 Killers") (1999) as Mioduch
 E=mc2 (2002) as Doktor Adam Kuczka
  (Eng. "Superproduction") (2002) as television presenter

As guest 
  (eng. Nanny) (2006) episode 33 as Szymon Majewski
  (Eng. "Evening with Alice")

Host of 
  (2004, TVN)
  (Eng. "Group of Szczepan") (90s, Radio Zet)
  (2005, Radio Zet)
  (Eng. "Word's cutting and bending")
  (Eng. "Likeable show for nice people")
  (Eng. Simon says show)
  (2005, TVN)
  (Eng. "Szymon looks for madmen") (TVN7)

External links 
 Webpage of Szymon Majewski Show
 

1967 births
Living people
Polish journalists